Zurab Konstantinovich Tsereteli (born 4 January 1934) is a Georgian-Russian painter, sculptor and architect known for large-scale and at times controversial monuments. Tsereteli has served as the President of the Russian Academy of Arts since 1997.

Life 
Zurab Konstantinovich Tsereteli was born in Tbilisi on 4 January 1934. Tsereteli studies at Tbilisi State Academy of Arts, graduating in 1958. The same year, he married Inessa Andronikashvili, a princess from a noble Georgian family that claims patrilineal descent from Byzantine Emperor Andronikos I Komnenos.

Between the years 1960–1963, Tsereteli worked as a staff artist as the Georgian Academy of Sciences, participating in research expeditions, which in turn served to influence his work. Tsereteli was then granted the position of senior master at the industrial combine of the USSR's Arts Foundation in Tbilisi, where he began to experiment with bronze, stone, glass, wood, and mosaics, as well as creating group commissions for public buildings.

In 1964, he made his first trip abroad to France. He stayed in Paris for three months, during which time visited Pablo Picasso in his studio. This experience served to greatly shape his later creative production. At a later stage he also became acquainted with Marc Chagall and other Impressionist and Post-Impressionist artists, whose characteristic influences can also be seen in the artist's work.

Following his return home, Tsereteli became the chief designer of Soviet resorts on the Black Sea, such as Pitsunda (1967) and Adler (1972). In these works, he combined monumental sculpture, architectural scenery, and three-dimensional mosaic compositions. Following his completion of the project in Pitsunda in 1967, Tsereteli was awarded the title of Honoured Artist of Georgia.

In the 1970s, Tsereteli continued to make public projects in Tbilisi, Ulyanovsk, Yalta and other cities. In this period, Tsereteli also designed several Soviet embassies and consulates over the world, such as those in Brazil, Portugal, and Japan.

In 1978–79, Tsereteli was invited to teach painting as a visiting professor at the College at Brockport, State University of New York. During his stay, he completed and presented to the college two public sculptures on the behalf of the people of the USSR: Prometheus (Light and Knowledge to the World), installed in front of the Allen Administration Building, and Joy and Happiness to All the Children of the World, placed by the Drake Memorial Library. The latter was created in collaboration with Joseph P. Kennedy Jr. Foundation in honour of the 1979 Special Olympics held in Brockport and the International Year of the Child.

In 1980, Tsereteli was appointed as the chief designer for the XXII Summer Olympic Games in Moscow. That same year, he completed A Hymn to Man, which sits atop the Concert and Cinema hall of the Izmailovo Hotel Complex, constructed for the Olympics and received the Order of “Friendship of Peoples”. In 1981, he became a professor at his alma mater, the Tbilisi Academy of Arts.

In 1983, he created Friendship Forever, in Moscow's Tishinskaya Square (1983), dedicated to the fellowship between the countries of Georgia and Russia. The architectural part of the monument was designed by Andrey Voznesensky. In the same period, Tsereteli began work on two large-scale projects in Tbilisi: the monument to Saint Nina (1988-1994), and the History of Georgia complex (1985–present). In 1988, Tsereteli was elected an Academician of the USSR Academy of Arts and his sculptural composition Break the Wall of Distrust was installed on Canon Street, London. In 1990, Good Defeats Evil, Tsereteli's interpretation of St. George slaying the dragon as an allegory for world peace in the modern age, was unveiled at the United Nations Headquarters.

In the 1990s, Tsereteli continued to work on public commissions for the city of Moscow, which many insist was due to his personal friendship with the mayor, Yuri Luzhkov. The most significant of these projects include: the reconstruction of Cathedral of Christ the Savior, Manege Square, the War Memorial Complex on Poklonnaya Gora, the Moscow Zoo, as well as the 98m tall Peter the Great, monument erected in 1996–97, which has caused mixed feelings among the citizens of Moscow.

The Birth of the New Man was inaugurated in Seville, Spain in 1995, in celebration of the European discovery of the New World by Christopher Columbus. The following year, in 1996, Marbella also received a sculpture, entitled Victory.

In 1997, Tsereteli was elected the President of the Russian Academy of Arts. He established the Moscow Museum of Modern Art in 1995, and it officially opened its doors in 1999, becoming the first state museum in the country entirely dedicated to modern and contemporary art. In 1998, Tsereteli had his first solo exhibition at the New Manege, which was dedicated to the memory of his wife, Inessa. This show became the starting point of the numerous travelling shows of his works, which followed in the 2000s-2010s in Russia, Georgia, Latvia, Belarus, Kazakhstan, Bulgaria, Italy, France, the United States, Australia, China, and Japan.

In 2001, the Gallery of Arts of Tsereteli was opened in Moscow as part of the museums and exhibitions complex of the Russian Academy of Arts. In 2006, Tsereteli unveiled his monument To the Struggle Against World Terrorism, or The Tear of Grief, in Bayonne, NJ. It was donated to the United States as an official gift by Russia in the aftermath of 9/11 attacks to show support and solidarity for the American people.

In 2007, Tsereteli became the UNESCO Ambassador of Good Will. In 2009–10, he was elected a Member of the European Academy of Sciences and Arts (Austria), given the title of Chevalier of the National Order of the Legion of Honor by France, as well as a 1st Rank Order “For Services to the Motherland” by the Russian Federation. In 2011, he received two awards from the Roman Academy of Fine Arts: the “For Life in Art” Prize and the International Giuseppe Sciacca Award for significant contribution to the arts. In 2014, Tsereteli received the UNESCO Five Continents Medal for his contribution to world culture, and in 2015 was elected a Member of the Chinese Academy of Fine Arts.

In 2005, Holocaust was donated by Russia to Israel and opened in Jerusalem. Some of his other works include: the sculpture of Nikolai Gogol in Rome's Villa Borghese (2002), Honoré de Balzac in Agde (2003), Marina Tsvetaeva in Saint-Gilles-Croix-de-Vie (2012), Founding Fathers of the European Union (2012) in Lorraine, and the monument to Pope John Paul II (2014) next to Notre-Dame de Paris cathedral facing the Seine.

Tsereteli founded the Museum of Modern Art in Tbilisi, Georgia in 2012.

Tsereteli continues his service as President of the Russian Academy of Arts, organises regular exhibitions by Georgian and international artists at the Museum of Modern Art in Tbilisi, as well as continuing to produce artwork.

On 6 December 2020, Tsereteli was honored the highest state order of Serbian for his contribution of the interior decoration of the Church of Saint Sava in Belgrade, for which the Russian Academy has been the main contractor.

Controversy 

Tsereteli has been heavily criticized throughout the duration of his career, with public opinion heavily shaped by his involvement with the Russian government. In March 2014 he was reported to have signed a letter in support of the position of the President of Russia Vladimir Putin on Russia's military intervention in Ukraine. However, the following day, a statement was released to several Georgian news outlets by the artist's aide, Sergi Shagulashvili, denied that Tsereteli signed the letter and that he "generally does not get involved in politics".

Offices 

 Professor and President of the Russian Academy of Arts.
 President of the Foundation for the Children's Park of Miracles (since 1988), hence the rumours of his involvement with the construction of Disneyland in Russia.
 Founder of the Moscow International Foundation for Support to UNESCO, he was appointed a UNESCO Goodwill Ambassador on 30 March 1996.
 Since 2005 he has been a member of the Public Chamber of Russia.
 Eminent Member of the Sergio Vieira de Mello Foundation.

Projects 

 The statue of Peter the Great in downtown Moscow which, at 94 meters, is the eighth tallest statue in the world. Popular legend states that the Statue was initially of Christopher Columbus, but that after being rejected by the US Government, its head was replaced, and it was sold to the Russian government as a nautical statue of Peter the Great. In November 2008, it was voted the tenth ugliest building in the world by Virtual Tourist.
 A statue known as Birth of the New World depicting Christopher Columbus. The statue was rejected by the US government when Tsereteli attempted to have it installed there in 1992, in connection with the 500th anniversary of his voyage. The municipal government of Cataño, Puerto Rico, consented to having the statue built in their town, but later was unable to garner enough public support and funding. On 15 August 2008, the private contractor in charge of building a series of facilities for the 2010 Central American and Caribbean Games announced that the corporation had bought the structure and will build it in the municipality of Mayagüez, expecting to assemble it in time for the games. After this project was abandoned, the statue was moved to the municipality of Arecibo, where its assembly began during the spring of 2014. The statue was unveiled in Arecibo on 14 June 2016. A smaller twin statue named The Birth of a New Man was given by Russia in 1993 and was assembled in Seville, where it is popularly known as Huevo de Colón (Columbus' Egg).
 The statue of St. George at the Moscow War Memorial and several versions of the same subject in Moscow and elsewhere. The foremost among these is a sculpture using sections of scrapped US Pershing II and Soviet SS-20 nuclear missiles.  The sculpture, entitled Good Defeats Evil is on the grounds of the UN building in New York City. The sculpture is a 39-foot high, 40 ton monumental bronze statue of St George fighting the dragon of nuclear war.  It was donated to the UN by the Soviet Union in 1990.
 A 9-1/2 meter tall, 2 metric ton treble clef covered in mosaic gold that tops the cupola of the Moscow International House of Music. The sculpture rotates like a weathervane.
 His Tear of Grief (actually titled To the Struggle Against World Terrorism) features a 40-foot teardrop suspended in the fissure of a 106-foot bronze rectangular tower.  The monument includes the names of all the victims of the 11 September 2001, attacks in New York, Washington D.C., and Pennsylvania, as well as the 1993 attack on the World Trade Center. At the ground breaking for the massive project, Vladimir Putin was present and called the sculpture “a gift from the people of Russia.” It was erected at the tip of the decommissioned Military Ocean Terminal, now rechristened The Peninsula at Bayonne Harbor, in Bayonne, New Jersey (after nearby Jersey City first accepted, then declined, the free monument) and was dedicated on 11 September 2006. The artist, Bill Clinton, Michael Chertoff, New Jersey Senator Jon Corzine, and a 9/11 widow all spoke at the dedication ceremony.
 On 25 September 2006, another Peter the Great statue by Tsereteli was installed on Vasilievsky Island, St. Petersburg, in front of the Pribaltiiskaya Hotel. The sculptor had originally wished it to be placed in front of the historic Manege next to St. Isaac's Cathedral, but this was turned down because of risk of damage to Quarenghi's building.
The Chronicle of Georgia (or History Memorial of Georgia)
 Other offers of statuary by Tsereteli rejected by intended recipients in recent years include a statue of Joseph Stalin, Franklin D. Roosevelt, and Winston Churchill next to Livadia Palace in Yalta (Ukraine), Magellan (Uruguay), the Colossus of Rhodes (Greece), Franklin D. Roosevelt (New York) and Balzac (France).

Cultural activities 

Tsereteli heads many cultural projects as a president of the Russian Academy of Arts

Honours and awards
 Hero of Socialist Labour, Order of Lenin and Gold medal "Hammer and Sickle" (11 November 1990) - for his great personal contribution to the development of Soviet art and productive social activities
 Order of Merit for the Fatherland;
1st class (26 July 2010) - for outstanding contribution to the development of fine arts and many years of creative activity
2nd class (4 January 2006) - for outstanding contribution to the development of fine arts
3rd class (29 April 1996) - for his great personal contribution to the development and successful completion of a complex of works on the Victory Monument, Poklonnaya Hill, Moscow
 Order of Friendship of Peoples (1994)
 People's Artist of the Russian Federation (4 January 1994) - for great achievements in the field of fine arts
 People's Artist of the USSR (1980)
 People's Artist of Georgia (1978)
 Russian Federation State Prize in Literature and Art (21 June 1996) - a memorial "Monument of Victory in Great Patriotic War of 1941-1945" on Poklonnaya Hill in Moscow
 Lenin Prize (1976) - for the space-decorations Children's Zone a resort town in Adler (1973)
 USSR State Prize
1970 - for the mosaic composition of Lenin memorial in Ulyanovsk (1969) and in the Palace of Trade Unions Tbilisi (1969–1970)
1982 - for participation in the creation of the hotel complex "Izmailovo" in Moscow (1980)
 Chevalier of the Legion of Honour (France, 2010)
 Officer of the Order of Arts and Letters (France, 2005)
 Medal "Astana" (Kazakhstan, 11 December 1998)
 Badge "For Services to Moscow" (Moscow, 30 December 2003) - for his great personal contribution to the development of fine art, many years of fruitful activity for the city and the Muscovites
 Order of Akhmad Kadyrov (Chechnya, 2005) - for his personal contribution to the commemoration of the first president of the Chechen Republic, the Hero of Russia Akhmad-Hadji Kadyrov, activities that promote peace, friendship and cooperation between peoples
 Medal "In Praise of Ossetia" (North Ossetia, 2010)

References

UNESCO participation
Moscow news: Zurab Disney Or Walt Tsereteli?
Artnet Magazine, July 10, 2006
moscow-life.com

External links

 
 The official site of To the Struggle Against World Terrorism monument by Zurab Tsereteli
 Artwork by Zurab Tsereteli at The Cold War Museum
 Good Defeats Evil at the New York Public Art Curriculum
 Monument to Peter the First from Inside and Above. Pictures

1934 births
Living people
Painters from Georgia (country)
Sculptors from Georgia (country)
Artists from Tbilisi
Soviet painters
Soviet sculptors
20th-century Russian painters
Russian male painters
21st-century Russian painters
Russian male sculptors
Russian contemporary artists
Colossal statues
Members of the Civic Chamber of the Russian Federation
Full Cavaliers of the Order "For Merit to the Fatherland"
Billionaires from Georgia (country)
Heroes of Socialist Labour
Recipients of the Order of Lenin
Recipients of the Order of Friendship of Peoples
People's Artists of Russia
Full Members of the Russian Academy of Arts
Honorary Members of the Russian Academy of Education
People's Artists of the USSR (visual arts)
State Prize of the Russian Federation laureates
Lenin Prize winners
Recipients of the USSR State Prize
Chevaliers of the Légion d'honneur
Officiers of the Ordre des Arts et des Lettres
20th-century sculptors
Tbilisi State Academy of Arts alumni
20th-century artists from Georgia (country)
21st-century artists from Georgia (country)
Naturalised citizens of Russia
UNESCO Goodwill Ambassadors
Architects from Tbilisi